William J. Liquori Jr. (born  1969) is a retired United States Space Force lieutenant general who has served as the deputy chief of space operations for strategy, plans, programs, requirements, and analysis from 2020 to 2022. A career space operator, he has operational experiences in support of Operation Southern Watch and Operation Enduring Freedom.

Early life and education
Liquori was born in Massachusetts. He graduated from Boston University in 1991 with a B.A. degree in computer science. He later received an M.A. degree in computer resources and information management in 1996 from Webster University. He also attended seminars from the Massachusetts Institute of Technology and University of North Carolina at Chapel Hill.

Military career 

Liquori entered the Air Force on May 11, 1991, as a distinguished graduate of the Air Force Reserve Officer Training Corps program at Boston University. His career has included numerous operations and staff positions in Air Force Space Command, the National Reconnaissance Office, the Air Force Secretariat, United States European Command and the Office of the Secretary of Defense. Liquori has commanded a space operations squadron and the 50th Space Wing. He is a graduate and former instructor of the USAF Weapons School. His operational experiences include operations Southern Watch and Enduring Freedom.

In July 2020, Liquori was nominated for transfer to the United States Space Force, promotion to lieutenant general, and assignment as deputy chief of space operations for strategy, plans, programs, requirements, and analysis.

Liquori retired from active duty in August 2022.

Assignments

1. May 1992 – July 1992, Student, Undergraduate Space Training, Lowry Air Force Base, Colorado
2. August 1992 – March 1996, Chief, UHF F/O Procedures Section, Senior Satellite Operations Crew Commander, Satellite Engineering Officer, Satellite Operations Crew Commander, Student, 3rd Space Operations Squadron, Falcon Air Force Base, Colorado
3. March 1996 – June 2000, Executive Officer, Chief, Launch Readiness Division, Operations Support Flight Commander, Senior Flight Commander, Flight Commander, Office of Space Operations, Assistant Secretary of the Air Force (Space) with duty at the National Reconnaissance Office, Onizuka Air Station, California
4. June 2000 – December 2000, Student, U.S. Air Force Weapons School, Nellis Air Force Base
5. January 2001 – June 2003, Assistant Operations Officer, Missions Flight Commander, Instructor,
328th Weapons Squadron, U.S. Air Force Weapons School, Nellis Air Force Base
6. July 2003 – June 2004, Student, Air Command and Staff College, Maxwell Air Force Base.
7. July 2004 – June 2005, Student, School of Advanced Air and Space Studies, Maxwell Air Force Base
8. July 2005 – June 2006, Chief, Space Control and Force Application Branch, National Security Space
Office, Office of the Under Secretary of the Air Force, the Pentagon, Arlington, Virginia
9. June 2006 – June 2008, Commander, Space Operations Squadron, Buckley Air Force Base, Colorado.
10. July 2008 – June 2009, Student, U.S. Marine Corps War College
11. July 2009 – June 2011, Chief, Missile Defense Division, Strategy, Policy, Partnering, and Capabilities Directorate, U.S. European Command, Stuttgart-Vaihingen, Germany
12. June 2011 – July 2013, Chief of Staff of the Air Force Fellow, with duty as Director, Space Policy Implementation, Office of the Deputy Assistant Secretary of Defense (Space), Office of the Under Secretary of Defense for Policy, the Pentagon
13. July 2013 – May 2015, Commander, 50th Space Wing, Schriever Air Force Base, Colorado
14. June 2015 – February 2016, Senior Military Assistant to the Under Secretary of the Air Force, the Pentagon
15. February 2016 – August 2018, Director, Space Policy, National Security Council, Executive Office of the President, Washington, D.C.
16. August 2018 – December 2019, Director of Strategic Requirements, Architectures and Analysis, Headquarters Air Force Space Command, Peterson Air Force Base, Colorado
17. December 2019–August 2020, Director of Strategic Requirements, Architectures and Analysis, Headquarters U.S. Space Force, Peterson AFB, Colo.
18. August 2020–August 2022, Deputy Chief of Space Operations for Strategy, Plans, Programs, Requirements, and Analysis, United States Space Force, the Pentagon, Arlington, VA.

Personal life 
Liquori is married to Amy Liquori with whom he has three children.

Awards and decorations

Liquori is the recipient of the following awards:

 2015 U.S. Air Force General and Mrs. Jerome F. O'Malley Award

Dates of promotion

Writings

References

 

 

 

 

Year of birth missing (living people)
Living people
Place of birth missing (living people)
Boston University alumni
Webster University alumni
United States Space Force generals
Marine Corps War College alumni
Recipients of the Legion of Merit
Office of the Chief of Space Operations personnel